Jasenovo (until 1899 ) is a village and municipality in Turčianske Teplice District in the Žilina Region of northern central Slovakia.

History
In historical records the village was first mentioned in 1495.

Geography
It has a population of about 169 people.

Genealogical resources

The records for genealogical research are available at the state archive "Statny Archiv in Bytca, Slovakia"

 Lutheran church records (births/marriages/deaths): 1647-1895 (parish B)

See also
 List of municipalities and towns in Slovakia

References

External links
https://web.archive.org/web/20070513023228/http://www.statistics.sk/mosmis/eng/run.html
Surnames of living people in Jasenovo

Villages and municipalities in Turčianske Teplice District